The following is a list of Bombycidae of Nepal. Fifteen different species are listed.

This list is primarily based on Colin Smith's 2010 "Lepidoptera of Nepal", which is based on Toshiro Haruta's "Moths of Nepal (Vol. 1-6)" with some recent additions and a modernized classification. The genus Mustilia is however placed under the family Endromidae now. 

Andraca angulata
Bivinculata kalikotei
Bombyx huttoni
Bombyx mori Note: It is an exotic species reared only for industrial purposes in silk production. It is native to China.
Ernolatia moorei
Gunda ochracea
Mustilia falcipennis
Mustilia hepatica
Mustilia phaeopera
Mustilia sphingiformis
Penicillifera lactea
Prismosticta fenestrata
Theophoba mirifica
Trilocha varians
Triuncina cervina

See also
List of butterflies of Nepal
Odonata of Nepal
Cerambycidae of Nepal
Zygaenidae of Nepal
Wildlife of Nepal

References

 01
Bombycidae
Insects of Nepal